Oliver Chambuso (born 7 September 1992), known professionally as Kesi, is a Danish rapper and songwriter. 

Kesi initially promoted himself through his own YouTube channel within the grime genre, also cooperating with others, notably Kidd and Gilli. In addition to his solo career, Kesi was a member of the hip hop group BOC (abbreviation for Bars of Crack or Bombs Over Copenhagen or Bombs Over Centrum), a Nørrebro-based group. Success on the Internet with particularly debut song "Byen Sover" led to a series of concerts and interest from established record labels, meaning that Kesi, at the age of 18, signed with Universal Records in July 2011.

In August 2011, Kesi released his first official single  "Slem dreng". This brought in huge media visibility, and an appearance on Danish broadcaster, TV 2 in a special feature Kesi also performed in a series of concerts, including at Roskilde Festival, Copenhagen Distortion and festival Sounds. His follow-up single on Universal was the single "Født I Dag", produced by Benny Jamz from BOC and also the single "Ku godt". His debut album Bomber Over Centrum was released in February 2012, followed by Ung hertug (2013) and Barn af Byen (2015).

During the following years, Kesi mostly focused on releasing singles, with "Følelsen", "Ligesom mig", "Kom over", "Su casa" (featuring Gilli), and "X" all topping the Danish charts between 2017 and 2019. After taking a five year break from albums, Kesi released his fourth studio album, BO4L, in 2020.

Discography

Albums

EPs

Singles

Featured on

Other charted songs

References

1993 births
Living people
Danish rappers
21st-century Danish musicians
Musicians from Copenhagen
Danish people of Tanzanian descent